Michel Malherbe (born 1941) is a French translator and philosopher. A specialist of Anglo-Saxon empiricism, he has translated Bacon, Locke and Hume. He is director of the series "Analyse et philosophie" and "Bibliothèque des philosophies" by Vrin.

Work

Bibliography 
 La Philosophie empiriste de David Hume, Paris, Vrin, coll. Bibliothèque d'histoire de la philosophie, 1976.
 Kant ou Hume ou la Raison et le sensible, Vrin, coll. Bibliothèque d'histoire de la philosophie, 1980, 338 p. ( for the 1993 reprint).
 Thomas Hobbes ou l'Œuvre de la raison, Vrin, coll. Bibliothèque d'histoire de la philosophie, 1984, 270 p., .
 Trois essais sur le sensible, Vrin, coll. Problèmes et controverses, 1991, 146 p., .
 Qu'est-ce que la causalité ? : Hume et Kant, Vrin, coll. Pré-textes, 1994, 126 p., .
 Des raisons de croire, Nantes, C. Defaut, 2006, 90 p.,  (texts from a conference delivered in 2005)
 Qu'est-ce que la politesse ?, Vrin, coll. Chemins Philosophiques, 2008, 128 p., 
 D'un pas de philosophe, Vrin, coll. Matière étrangère, 2013, 304 p.,

Translations 
 David Hume, L'histoire naturelle de la religion : et autres essais sur la religion, Vrin, 1971, 139 p.,  (texts selected in the context of a thesis defended in 1970)
 Dialogues sur la religion naturelle, Vrin, 1987, 158 p., 
 Essais moraux, politiques et littéraires, Ire partie, Vrin, 1999,  (introduction, translation and notes)
 Système sceptique et autres systèmes, Le Seuil, 2002, 338 p.,  (préeentation, translation and commentaries)
 Essais moraux, politiques et littéraires, IIe partie, Vrin, 2009,  (introduction, translation and notes)
 Enquête sur l'entendement humain, bilingual edition, Paris, Vrin, 2008, 420 p.,  (introduction, translation and notes)
 Francis Bacon, Novum Organum, Presses universitaires de France, coll. Épiméthée, 1986, 349 p.,  (translated with Jean-Marie Pousseur)
 Étienne Bonnot de Condillac, Traité des animaux, Vrin, 2004, 253 p.,

External links 
 Michel Malherbe on data.bnf.fr
 Michel Malherbe on Centre Atlantique de philosophy
 Michel Malherbe on France Culture
 Conversation philosophique avec Michel Malherbe on YouTube
 La mémoire avec Michel Malherbe on ARTE

Academic staff of the University of Nantes
20th-century French philosophers
21st-century French philosophers
Scholars of modern philosophy
English–French translators
École Normale Supérieure alumni
1941 births
Living people